Lior Levi (born 26 October 1987) is an Israeli footballer who currently plays for Hapoel Hod HaSharon in Liga Alef.

Notes

1987 births
Living people
Israeli footballers
Hapoel Kfar Saba F.C. players
Hapoel Ramat Gan F.C. players
Beitar Kfar Saba F.C. players
Hapoel Acre F.C. players
Hapoel Ironi Kiryat Shmona F.C. players
Hapoel Tel Aviv F.C. players
Hapoel Ra'anana A.F.C. players
Hapoel Rishon LeZion F.C. players
Hapoel Azor F.C. players
Hapoel Kfar Shalem F.C. players
Hapoel Hod HaSharon F.C. players
Israeli Premier League players
Liga Leumit players
Footballers from Kfar Saba
Association football defenders